La Penne-sur-Huveaune (literally La Penne on Huveaune; Provençal: La Pena d’Evèuna) is a commune east of Marseille and west of Aubagne along the A50 autoroute in the department of Bouches-du-Rhône in the Provence-Alpes-Côte d'Azur region in southern France.

The river Huveaune flows through it, from which the commune derived its name.

Population

See also
Communes of the Bouches-du-Rhône department

References

Communes of Bouches-du-Rhône
Bouches-du-Rhône communes articles needing translation from French Wikipedia